The Vaal River Barrage Reservoir is a dam on the Vaal River near Vanderbijlpark, border Gauteng and Free State, South Africa.

The Barrage, created by a set of gates across the Vaal River, was built by Rand Water downstream of the Vaal Dam, in 1923.  The reservoir is 64 kilometres long and has a total storage capacity of 63 million litres, a surface area of 168,35 square kilometres and has an average depth of 4,5 metres.  The rivers, i.e. Suikerbosrant, Klip, & Rietspruit, that feed into the Vaal River Barrage Reservoir flow from industrial and heavily populated areas such as Johannesburg, Vereeniging and Sasolburg. This reservoir was used to supply water to the Witwatersrand but no longer does so because the quality of its water is deteriorating due to pollution. This reservoir, which is managed by Rand Water, is used for many recreational activities, such as boating, skiing, fishing, and swimming, with many holiday resorts found along its banks.

See also
List of reservoirs and dams in South Africa
List of rivers of South Africa

References

External links 
 List of South African Dams from the Department of Water Affairs

Dams in South Africa
Dams completed in 1923
1923 establishments in South Africa